Members of the New South Wales Legislative Council between 1964 and 1967 were indirectly elected by a joint sitting of the New South Wales Parliament, with 15 members elected every three years. The most recent election was on 21 November 1963, with the term of new members commencing on 23 April 1964. The President was William Dickson until his death in May 1966 and then Harry Budd.

References

See also
Renshaw ministry
First Askin ministry

Members of New South Wales parliaments by term
20th-century Australian politicians